Huaping (Hua-pʻing) may refer to - 
Huaping County, Lijiang, Yunnan, China
Huaping Islet, Zhongzheng, Keelung, Taiwan